The spotted gurnard (Pterygotrigla picta) is a species of ray-finned fish belonging to the family Triglidae, the gurnards and sea robins. This fish is found in the eastern Pacific Ocean.  Its length is up to 35 cm.

Taxonomy
The spotted gurnard was first formally described as Trigla picta in 1880 by the German-born British ichthyologist Albert Günther from a holotype collected by the survey ship HMS Challenger off the Juan Fernández Islands of Chile. The species is placed in the subgenus Pterygotrigla. The specific name picta means "painted", Günther did not explain his choice of this name but it is thought that it was the wide, round blotches on the body and fins, except for the abdomen which he described as "drops".

Description
The spotted gurnard is largely coloured red with obvious black spotting on the body and fins, other than the abdomen.

Distribution and habitat
The spotted gurnard is found in the southeastern Pacific, although there has been some confusion between this species and the painted latchet (Pterygotrigla andertoni), which is called spotted gurnard in New Zealand. This species has been recorded near the Juan Fernandez Islands, the Desventuradas Islands and the neighbouring guyots of Sala y Gomez and Nazca Ridges, they have also been reported from Easter Island and west to the Norfolk Ridge, New Caledonia and other seamounts and undersea ridges.

References

Pterygotrigla
Fish described in 1880
Taxa named by Albert Günther